Aethalopteryx dictyotephra is a moth in the family Cossidae. It is found in south-western Africa, including Namibia and South Africa.

References

Moths described in 1959
Aethalopteryx
Moths of Africa
Insects of Namibia